Clare Fallon is an English journalist currently employed as the North of England Correspondent on Channel 4 News.

Career
Clare has worked for Granada Reports and BBC North West Tonight before moving to her current role as Channel 4 North of England Correspondent in 2018.

Awards

Royal Television Society
 Best Regional on Screen Talent 2012.

References

External links
Channel 4 Biography

British radio journalists
Channel 4 people
English women journalists
English television journalists
Living people
Mass media people from Devon
Year of birth missing (living people)